Yorùbá Football Federation was founded as a football organization for the Yoruba people internationally. The organization was admitted into second world organization organizing a football cup aside from FIFA, the CONIFA Confederation of independent football association in October, 2020.  The Yoruba Football Federation is not a member of FIFA, CAF or WAFU therefore it can't play any games organised by these organizations.

History 
The Yoruba  Football Federation  came into existence 1 September 2020 with grounds at Onikan Stadium Yorubaland.  The Yoruba are a great footballing nation both as players and supporters, the presence of Yoruba footballers allows the Yoruba to grow and celebrate its own.

In October 2020 the Yoruba  Football Federation was admitted into the Confederation of Independent Football Associations (CONIFA).  CONIFA is the football federations for all associations outside of FIFA.

YFF is planning to go for the first CONIFA Africa Football Cup that will come up in Zanzibar in November and also in the CONIFA World Football Cup.

Colours and logo 
 
The official colours of the Yorùbá Football Federation are green, red, black and white, like the Yoruba Flag.

The meaning of the shirt colours is as follows: "Red represents the blood of the martyrs shed in the various struggle of the Yoruba wars from ancient history, through the Fulani invasions to the Operation Wetie, the Agbekoya revolt and the June 12 uprising, among others. Black represents the colour of the black man's skin. The Yoruba represent the largest collection of any ethnic group of the black race anywhere in the world. We are the shining beacon for all black people all over the world."

References

Football in Nigeria
Yoruba
African national and official selection-teams not affiliated to FIFA